General John Hely-Hutchinson, 2nd Earl of Donoughmore, GCB KC (15 May 1757 – 29 June 1832) was an Anglo-Irish politician, hereditary peer and soldier.

Background
He was the son of John Hely-Hutchinson and the Baroness Donoughmore. In 1801 he was created Baron Hutchinson in the Peerage of the United Kingdom (gaining a seat in the House of Lords) and later succeeded to all his brother Richard's titles. He was educated at Eton College, Magdalen College, Oxford, and Trinity College, Dublin. He died 29 June 1832, never having married.

Military career
He entered the Army as a cornet in the 18th Dragoons in 1774, rising to a lieutenant the next year. In 1776 he was promoted to become a captain in the 67th Regiment of Foot, and a major there in 1781. He moved regiments again in 1783, becoming a lieutenant-colonel in, and colonel-commandant of, the 77th Regiment of Foot, which was, however, disbanded shortly afterwards following an earlier mutiny. He spent the next 11 years on half-pay, studying military tactics in France before serving as a volunteer in the Flanders campaigns of 1793 as aide-de-camp to Sir Ralph Abercromby.

In March 1794 he obtained brevet promotion to colonel and the colonelcy of the old 94th Regiment of Foot and then became a major-general in May 1796, serving in Ireland during the Irish Rebellion of 1798, where he was second-in-command at the Battle of Castlebar under General Lake. In 1799, he was in the expedition to the Netherlands.

Hely-Hutchinson was second-in-command of the 1801 expedition to Egypt, under Abercromby. Following Abercromby's death in March after being wounded at the Battle of Alexandria, Hely-Hutchinson took command of the force. From then he was able to besiege the French firstly at Cairo which capitulated in June and then besieged and took Alexandria culminating in the capitulation of over 22,000 French soldiers. In reward for his successes there, the Ottoman Sultan Selim III made him a Knight, 1st Class, of the Order of the Crescent.

In recognition of his "eminent services" during the "late glorious and successful campaign in Egypt", at the request of the King, the United Kingdom Parliament settled on Lord Hutchinson and the next two succeeding heirs male of his body an annuity of £2,000 per annum, paid out of the Consolidated Fund.

He was promoted lieutenant-general in September 1803, and made Governor of Stirling Castle. In March 1802 he was made Colonel in Chief of the 74th (Highland) Regiment of Foot.

He was made a full general in June 1813. In 1806, he became Colonel in Chief of the 57th (West Middlesex) Regiment of Foot, transferring in 1811 to be Colonel in Chief of the 18th Regiment of Foot, a position he held until his death in 1832. He also held the position of Governor of Stirling Castle from 1806 until his death.

Political career
Hely-Hutchinson sat as Member of Parliament (MP) for Lanesborough from 1776 to 1783 and for Taghmon from 1789 to 1790. Subsequently, he represented Cork City in the Irish House of Commons until the Act of Union in 1801 and was then MP for Cork City in the after-Union Parliament of the United Kingdom until 1802.

References
Notes

Sources
The Royal Military Calendar, Or Army Service and Commission Book, ed. John Philippart. p. 1, Vol II of V, 3rd edition, London, 1820. Online edition at Google Books
Parliamentary Election Results in Ireland, 1801-1922, edited by B. M. Walker (Royal Irish Academy 1978)
Dictionary of National Biography entry

External links

1757 births
1832 deaths
17th Lancers officers
57th Regiment of Foot officers
67th Regiment of Foot officers
77th Regiment of Foot officers
Alumni of Magdalen College, Oxford
Alumni of Trinity College Dublin
British Army generals
British Army personnel of the French Revolutionary Wars
Highland Light Infantry officers
Irish MPs 1776–1783
Irish MPs 1783–1790
Irish MPs 1790–1797
Irish MPs 1798–1800
Knights Grand Cross of the Order of the Bath
Lord-Lieutenants of Tipperary
Members of the Parliament of the United Kingdom for Cork City
People educated at Eton College
People of the Irish Rebellion of 1798
Royal Irish Regiment (1684–1922) officers
UK MPs 1801–1802
UK MPs who inherited peerages
Younger sons of barons
Knights of the Order of the Crescent
John
Members of the Parliament of Ireland (pre-1801) for County Longford constituencies
Members of the Parliament of Ireland (pre-1801) for County Wexford constituencies
Members of the Parliament of Ireland (pre-1801) for Cork City
Earls of Donoughmore